"What Might Have Been" is a song recorded by American country music group Little Texas.  It was released in May 1993 as the lead-off single from their second (and breakthrough) album, Big Time.  It was written by Julian Williams and the band's lead guitarist Porter Howell, rhythm guitarist Dwayne O'Brien, and keyboardist and vocalist Brady Seals.  The song reached number 2 on the Billboards Hot Country Songs chart, behind Sawyer Brown's "Thank God for You", and number 11 on the Canadian RPM country Tracks chart in 1993. It is one of their best known songs, peaking at number 16 on the Hot Adult Contemporary Tracks chart.

Content
In this song, the narrator tells himself or his former romantic interest that he cannot change the past and that there is no way to know what their relationship could have become. The exact circumstances are left open-ended.

Music video
Two music videos of the song, directed by Jack Cole, were filmed for the song. The first version, filmed entirely in sepia tone, focuses around World War II and shows a couple dancing just before the man has to go off to war. Old stock footage from the war is shown also.

The second version premiered in mid-1993, and features a man named Michael, who brings his son, Tommy, to visit Michael's grandfather, Nathan, who lives in a nursing home. After arriving, Tommy shows his great-grandfather a photograph that he had found of Nathan with a woman he met during World War II, named Clarice. Throughout the visit, Nathan shares various stories with Michael about Clarice, along with the fact that they had lost all contact with each other after the war ended. After Michael and Tommy leave, Nathan walks about the nursing home hallways when he passes an elderly woman. He suddenly stops and turns around to see if the woman looks familiar - it turns out to be his long, lost love, Clarice. As they reunite, the video flashes back to the younger Clarice and Nathan sharing a kiss. The band is also seen performing throughout the video. This version has been played on CMT, TNN and GAC, as well as CMT's sister channel, Pure Country.

Chart performance
"What Might Have Been" debuted at number 72 on the U.S. Billboard Hot Country Singles & Tracks for the week of May 29, 1993.

Weekly charts

Year-end charts

References

1993 singles
1993 songs
Little Texas (band) songs
Songs written by Brady Seals
Songs written by Dwayne O'Brien
Songs written by Porter Howell
Song recordings produced by James Stroud
Warner Records singles